The men's field hockey tournament at the 2007 Pan American Games was held between 16–25 July 2007 in Rio de Janeiro, Brazil. The tournament doubled as the qualification to the 2008 Summer Olympics to be held in Beijing, China.

Canada won the tournament for the fourth time after defeating Argentina 5–4 in a penalty shoot-out after the final finished a 2–2 draw. Chile won the bronze medal after defeating Trinidad and Tobago 5–3 in the third place playoff.

Qualification

Umpires
Below are the 10 umpires appointed by the Pan American Hockey Federation:

 Saleem Aaron (USA)
 Murray Grime (AUS)
 Daniel Lopez Ramos (URU)
 Albert Marcano (TTO)
 Germán Montes de Oca (ARG)
 Raúl Peña Vila (CUB)
 Sumseh Putra (CAN)
 Amarjit Singh (MAS)
 Constantine Soteriades (USA)
 Diego Wenz Küpfer (CHL)

Results

Preliminary round

Pool A

Pool B

Fifth to eighth place classification

Cross-overs

Seventh and eighth place

Fifth and sixth place

Medal round

Semi-finals

Bronze-medal match

Gold-medal match

Final standings

 Qualified for the 2008 Summer Olympics

Medalists

References

External links
Official website
Official PAHF website

Men's tournament
Pan American Games
2007